The Rose City Electric Automobile Garage, located in northwest Portland, Oregon, is listed on the National Register of Historic Places.

See also
 National Register of Historic Places listings in Northwest Portland, Oregon

References

Further reading

1910 establishments in Oregon
Buildings designated early commercial in the National Register of Historic Places
Garages (parking) on the National Register of Historic Places
Individually listed contributing properties to historic districts on the National Register in Oregon
National Register of Historic Places in Portland, Oregon
Northwest Portland, Oregon
Transport infrastructure completed in 1910
Transportation buildings and structures on the National Register of Historic Places in Oregon
Transportation buildings and structures in Portland, Oregon